Bruce Edward McCray (born October 27, 1963) is a former American football defensive back who played one season with the Chicago Bears of the National Football League. McCray attended Wichita East High School in Wichita, Kansas. He first enrolled at Independence Community College before transferring to Western Illinois University. He was also a member of the Chicago Bruisers of the Arena Football League.

References

External links
Just Sports Stats
Fanbase profile

Living people
1963 births
Players of American football from Wichita, Kansas
American football defensive backs
African-American players of American football
Independence Pirates football players
Western Illinois Leathernecks football players
Chicago Bears players
Chicago Bruisers players
National Football League replacement players
21st-century African-American people
20th-century African-American sportspeople